El Rey Network (Spanish for The King) is a media brand founded by Robert Rodriguez on December 15, 2013, that is currently owned in a joint venture with FactoryMade Ventures.

Until December 31, 2020, El Rey was a cable and satellite network, operated and distributed in-partnership with Univision Communications (now known as TelevisaUnivision), dedicated to Grindhouse-style programming targeting Hispanic audiences. By March 2015, approximately 40 million households received El Rey; its carriage would fall to 13 million households by the time of the network's closure.

History

As a television network (2013–2020)
El Rey Network was one of two ethnic outlets created as part of an agreement between Comcast, NBC Universal, and the FCC as a condition for the merger between the former two broadcasters (the other network being Revolt).

The network's headquarters was in Austin, Texas, and launched as part of the digital basic service on some of Comcast's systems. Comcast announced that the network was expected to debut by January 2014. In August 2012, Antoinette Alfonso Zel was announced as CEO. In May 2013, Univision Communications (now known as TelevisaUnivision USA) announced that it would be  an investor for El Rey, handling the sales and distribution of the network. 

In November 2013, it was announced that the production of From Dusk till Dawn: The Series had begun. Upon launch in the week of December 15, 2013, El Rey was also offered by cable companies Time Warner Cable, with Bright House Networks offering soon later in January 2014, and Cox Communications by February 2014. Cablevision added the network on April 7, 2014.
 
The first satellite service to host El Rey was DirecTV in January 2014.

That year, Lucha libre program Lucha Underground, featuring wrestlers from Lucha Libre AAA World Wide (AAA) and produced by Mark Burnett, premiered on October 29, 2014. The show would go on to become the network's flagship series and both it, and the corresponding promotion, received positive reception.

Dish Network would begin carrying El Rey in January 2015. The following month, El Rey was made available through cable company Suddenlink Communications in select markets.
El Rey was added to AT&T U-verse and Verizon FiOS that same year.

Between 2018 and 2020, various cable and satellite providers began dropping the network. On November 6, 2020, Univision announced it had sold its stake in El Rey, as part of a larger effort by the company to refocus on its core Spanish-language businesses. Soon after, it would be reported that El Rey would cease operations on December 31, though it was speculated that the network would relaunch as a streaming brand. The network went dark at 2:59 a.m. Eastern.

As a streaming network (2021–present)
On August 6, 2021, El Rey Network announced a partnership with Cinedigm that would see the network relaunch as a streaming channel. As part of this agreement, Cinedigm will exclusively distribute Rodriguez's 2019 film, Red 11, and a companion docuseries titled Rebel Without a Crew: The Robert Rodriguez Film School. El Rey would relaunch later that month via The Roku Channel on August 17.

Programming

El Rey Network's original programming included action genre series, sports, and lifestyle programming. Annual programming included a marathon of Toho-produced Godzilla films during the Christmas & Independence Day weekends and the Thanksgiving Way of the Turkey marathon of kung fu films.

Original programming

 Baja Desert Championship (2017–2020)
 Bushido Battleground (2017)
 The Chuey Martinez Show (2019–2020)
 Correctamundo! (2020)
Cutting Crew
 The Director's Chair with Robert Rodriguez (2014–2020) 
 El Rey Nation (2019–2020)
 Explosion Jones, starring Michael Madsen 
 From Dusk till Dawn: The Series (2014–2016)
 Lucha Underground (2014–2018)
 Man at Arms: Art of War (2017–2020) 
 ¡MARIA! with Maria Cardona (2020)
 Matador (2014) 
 Rebel Without a Crew: The Series (2018)
 Rite of Passage (2017)
 United Tacos of America (2019–2020) 
 Vampiro: Unleashed (2020)

Acquired programming

 19-2
 Airwolf
 Alien Nation
 Almost Human
 Biker Mice from Mars
 Clerks: The Animated Series
 Cold Squad
 Constantine
 Core Culture
 Crunch Time
 Day 5
 Demons
 Flatland
 Freddy's Nightmares
 Happy Tree Friends (Season 3-4)
 Human Target
 I Am the Greatest: The Adventures of Muhammad Ali
 Incredible Hulk
 Kidnapped
 Knight Rider
 Mercy Point
 Miami Vice
 Mondo Animation Hour
 Night Sweats (2016-2018)
 Night Visions
 Pros vs. Joes
 Quantum Leap
 Red vs. Blue
 Relic Hunter
 Texas Justice
 Toxic Crusaders
 Stargate Atlantis
 Stargate SG-1
 Starhunter: ReduX
 Starsky and Hutch
 The A-Team
 The Twilight Zone
 The X-Files 
 V
 Xena: Warrior Princess

Film releases
 Crow's Blood
 Kung Fury
 The People's Network Showcase
 Red 11

See also
 Robert Rodriguez
 Corey Burton, Continuity announcer.

References

Further reading

External links

 
 
 

2013 establishments in Texas
Television channels and stations established in 2013
Television channels and stations disestablished in 2020
Robert Rodriguez
Defunct television networks in the United States
Former Univision Communications subsidiaries
Cinedigm